is a Japanese former competitive figure skater. He won two medals on the ISU Junior Grand Prix series and placed as high as fourth at the World Junior Championships. He finished tenth at the 2005 Four Continents Championships.

Programs

Results
GP: Grand Prix; JGP: Junior Grand Prix

References

External links
 

Japanese male single skaters
Sportspeople from Yokohama
1986 births
Living people